The 1920 United States presidential election in North Dakota took place on November 2, 1920, as part of the 1920 United States presidential election which was held throughout all contemporary 48 states. Voters chose five representatives, or electors to the Electoral College, who voted for president and vice president.

North Dakota voted for Republican nominee, Senator Warren G. Harding of Ohio, over the Democratic nominee, Governor James M. Cox of Ohio. Harding ran with Governor Calvin Coolidge of Massachusetts, while Cox ran with Assistant Secretary of the Navy Franklin D. Roosevelt of New York. Harding won the state by a landslide margin of 59.60 percentage points, the strongest performance of any presidential candidate in state history.

With 77.97 percent of the popular vote, North Dakota would prove to be Harding's strongest state in terms of popular vote percentage and margin of victory.

Results

Results by county

See also
 United States presidential elections in North Dakota

References

North Dakota
1920
1920 North Dakota elections